Peer Bork (born 4 May 1963) is a German bioinformatician. He is Director of the European Molecular Biology Laboratory (EMBL) site in Heidelberg, in south-west Germany.

Bork received his PhD in biochemistry in 1990 from the Leipzig University and his habilitation in theoretical biophysics in 1995 from the Humboldt University of Berlin. He was appointed a Group Leader at EMBL in 1995. He has worked on the microbiomes of humans and other animals.

He is on the board of editorial reviewers of Science, and is a senior editor of the journal Molecular Systems Biology.

In 2000 Bork was elected as a Member of the European Molecular Biology Organization, and in 2008 he received the Nature "mid-career achievement" award for science mentoring in Germany. He was appointed a member of the German National Academy of Sciences Leopoldina in 2014.  He received an honorary doctorate from the University of Würzburg in 2014 and the University of Utrecht in 2017.

In 2021, Bork was awarded the 'Novozymes Prize' "for developing groundbreaking, publicly available and integrative bioinformatic tools" by the Novo Nordisk Foundation. He was also awarded the 2021 International Society for Computational Biology 'Accomplishments by a Senior Scientist Award' for "tremendous contributions to bioinformatics on a plethora of fronts within the field".

References

Members of the European Molecular Biology Organization
Living people
Human Genome Project scientists
21st-century German biologists
Members of the German Academy of Sciences Leopoldina
1963 births